"All I Do Is Win" is a song from DJ Khaled's fourth studio album Victory (2010). It was the third single from the album. The track features  American rappers T-Pain, Ludacris, Snoop Dogg and Rick Ross. It was released on February 8, 2010, along with "Put Your Hands Up". The song peaked at number 24 on the US Billboard Hot 100 chart. The single was certified triple platinum by the Recording Industry Association of America (RIAA).

Music video
The music video debuted on BET's 106 and Park on March 3, 2010, along with the video for "Put Your Hands Up". It pictures DJ Khaled with his BET Awards and is filmed mostly against a green screen, also featuring a scene of his appearance at the 2008 BET Hip-Hop Awards show accepting an award for his song "I'm So Hood (Remix)".

A video for the official remix was shot in Florida. The video was directed by Dayo & Gil Green. Photos of the shoot were also leaked online. The video features cameos from Nicki Minaj, Fabolous, Fat Joe, Jadakiss, Puff Daddy, Ace Hood, Cam'Ron and Busta Rhymes. A behind-the-scenes video was released on June 2, 2010. The remix's music video was released on June 29, 2010.

Remix

On April 28, 2010, the official remix was released. It features Rick Ross, Busta Rhymes, Diddy, Nicki Minaj, Fabolous, Jadakiss, Fat Joe, Swizz Beatz on background vocals, and T-Pain. Jadakiss's verse is a sample from "Allergic to Losing", a song from his 2010 mixtape The Champ Is Here 3. The remix was released as a digital single on iTunes on June 8, 2010. A music video has been shot and was released on June 29, 2010. DJ Khaled also raps a verse on the remix.

There is another remix titled "Hood Remix" or "G-Mix" which is by Nappy Boy artist Young Cash. The remix features a new rap line up, Yo Gotti, Gudda Gudda, Bun B, Ice Berg, 2 Chainz, T-Pain, and Field Mob. On this version, instead of T-Pain on the chorus, Young Cash is, while T-Pain delivers a verse of his own.

In popular culture 
The song has become an anthem for numerous sports teams. The New York Knicks professional basketball team used an instrumental version of the song for their player intros during the 2010–11 NBA season.

The song has gained popularity among Miami Hurricanes football fans as Snoop Dogg's line "We like the U in the '80s" refers to the University of Miami football team that dominated college football in the 1980s and early 1990s. It was subsequently arranged for the Band of the Hour, Miami's marching band. Internet mashup artist DJ Earworm has included the song in a mash-up designed for the 2012 Summer Olympics.

A remix version was made in December 2011 for Tim Tebow of the Denver Broncos, called "All He Does Is Win" – the video went viral on YouTube.

At the 2013 White House Correspondents' Dinner, President Barack Obama was introduced to "Hail to the Chief", which quickly cut to a snippet of "All I Do is Win".

On April 28, 2014, actress Emma Stone lip synched the song in a "Lip Sync Battle" against late-night talk show host Jimmy Fallon.

The YouTube channel Barack's Dubs created and uploaded a mashup video of U.S. President Donald Trump singing the song.

This song is referenced on one of the "Coke and a Song" bottles and cans available as of Summer 2016.

The song is featured in a Classico Pasta Sauce commercial that debuted in mid-late 2016.

The remix was used in the DuckTales episode "The 87 Cent Solution", during the scene in which Flintheart Glomgold barged uninvited into Scrooge McDuck's funeral and made an irreverent spectacle of himself by dancing to the song in a glittery tuxedo.

Chart performance
All I Do Is Win debuted at number 63 on the US Billboard Hot 100 chart date of March 6, 2010, and peaked at this chart at number 24 for the chart dated July 24, 2010. The song also peaked at number eight on US Hot R&B/Hip-Hop Songs in 2010. In May 2014, the song re-entered the Hot R&B/Hip-Hop Songs chart at number 23. On June 19, 2015, the single was certified triple platinum by the Recording Industry Association of America (RIAA) for sales of over three million copies in the United States.

The song debuted on the Canadian Hot 100 chart at No. 69 for the chart date of March 6, 2010.

Charts

Weekly charts

Year-end charts

Certifications

References

External links
 
 

2010 singles
2009 songs
DJ Khaled songs
Ludacris songs
Rick Ross songs
Snoop Dogg songs
T-Pain songs
Songs written by Ludacris
Songs written by T-Pain
Songs written by Snoop Dogg
Nicki Minaj songs
Songs written by Nicki Minaj
Sean Combs songs
Fabolous songs
Fat Joe songs
Busta Rhymes songs
Jadakiss songs
Swizz Beatz songs
Music videos directed by Gil Green
Songs written by Rick Ross
MNRK Music Group singles